Fenouillet-Saint-Alban is a former railway station in Fenouillet, Occitanie, France. The station is on the Bordeaux–Sète railway. The station was served by TER (local) services operated by SNCF, between Montauban and Toulouse until 2016.

References

Defunct railway stations in Haute-Garonne